The Wilmington, Delaware race riot of 1919 was a violent racial riot between white and black residents of Wilmington, Delaware on November 13, 1919.

Shooting

The Price family were  African-American suspects in the robbery of a Wilmington, Delaware gun store. The guns, in turn, had been pawned throughout the city. While raiding the Price house Patrolman Thomas L. Zebley (sometimes spelled Scebley) was killed and Officer Harry F. Pierce was shot twice in the lungs. When the two officers entered the house the three brothers were sleeping. When awakened by the officers the brothers took guns from under their pillows and started shooting. Three brothers were arrested at the scene: Lemuel, James and John Price. Lemuel is thought to have shot Zebley through the heart.

Race riot
As news of the shooting spread an angry white mob grew and tried to lynch the three brothers. Wilmington police were able to prevent this by secreting the brothers to Philadelphia's Central police station. When the mob found out the brothers were out of their reach they turned their anger on the black community. One mob of 300 whites were rampaging through the black part of town. When they encountered 4 black men, the two parties shot at each other and African-American Bannel Fields was wounded with a shot in the head.

Police were able to stop the rioting and enacted a number of measures including stopping the sale of firearms.

Red Summer of 1919

This uprising was one of several incidents of civil unrest that began in the so-called American Red Summer, of 1919. The Summer consisted of terrorist attacks on black communities, and white oppression in over three dozen cities and counties. In most cases, white mobs attacked African American neighborhoods. In some cases, black community groups resisted the attacks, especially in Chicago and Washington, D.C. Most deaths occurred in rural areas during events like the Elaine Race Riot in Arkansas, where an estimated 100 to 240 black people and 5 white people were killed. Also occurring in 1919 were the Chicago Race Riot and Washington D.C. race riot which killed 38 and 39 people respectively, and with both having many more non-fatal injuries and extensive property damage reaching up into the millions of dollars.

See also
Wilmington riot of 1968
Mass racial violence in the United States
List of incidents of civil unrest in the United States

Bibliography 
Notes

References  

  
  
 - Total pages: 234 

1919 in Delaware
1919 in military history
1919 riots in the United States
November 1919 events
African-American history between emancipation and the civil rights movement
History of racism in Delaware
Racially motivated violence against African Americans
Red Summer
Riots and civil disorder in Delaware
White American riots in the United States